Bradley Stewart Anderson (born January 12, 1961 in Glendale, Arizona) is a former American football wide receiver in the National Football League. Anderson was  an 8th round selection (212th overall pick) in the 1984 NFL Draft by the Chicago Bears.
He played two seasons for the Bears (1984–1985) after attending both Brigham Young University and the University of Arizona.  Anderson was part of the 1985 Bears team that won Super Bowl XX.

References

1961 births
Living people
Sportspeople from Glendale, Arizona
American football wide receivers
BYU Cougars football players
Arizona Wildcats football players
Chicago Bears players
Players of American football from Arizona